Lycia and Pamphylia was the name of a province of the Roman empire, located in southern Anatolia. It was created by the emperor Vespasian (69–79), who merged Lycia and Pamphylia into a single administrative unit. In 43 AD, the emperor Claudius had annexed Lycia. Pamphylia had been a part of the province of Galatia.

The borders drawn by Vespasian ran west of the River Indus (which flowed from its upper valley in Caria) from the Pisidian plateau up to Lake Ascanius (Burdur Gölü), to the south of Apamea.  In the north and east it formed a line which followed the shores of the lakes Limna (Hoyran Gölü) and Caralis (Beyşehir Gölü), turned south towards the Gulf of Adalla (mare Pamphylium) and followed the Taurus Mountains (Toros Dağları) for some ten miles towards east up to Isauria. It then followed Cilicia Trachea to reach the sea to the west of Iotape. The borders were drawn taking into account  geographical and economic factors. The whole of the basins of the rivers Xanthus, Cestrus (Ak Su) and Eurymedon (Köprü Irmak) were included. The main cities were at the mouth of the latter two rivers. In Pisidia and in Pamphylia they were in part followed by the few roads into the interior of Anatolia. The most important one was the road from Attalea (Antalya) to Apamea. In Lycia the road from Patara towards Laodicea on the Lycus followed the coast. Important cities were Side, Ptolemais, Gagae and Myra on the coast, Seleucia, inland and Cremna, Colbhasa and Comama, on the Pisidian Plateau, where Augustus had founded Roman colonies (settlements). On the Milyas plateau there were Oenoanda, Tlos, Nisa, Podalia, Termessus, and Trebenna. Other important cities in Lycia include Pednelissus, Ariassus, and Sagalassus; along the Eurymedon, Aspendus and Perge, which had a sanctuary of Artemis. The most important city in the region was Patara, at the mouth of the Xanthus.

Under the administrative reforms of emperor Diocletian (reigned AD 284–305), who doubled the number of Roman provinces by reducing their size, Lycia et Pamphylia was split into two separate provinces. The provinces were grouped into twelve dioceses which were under the four Praetorian prefectures of the empire. Lycia and Pamphylia were under of Diocese of Asia (Dioecesis Asiana), of the  Praetorian Prefecture of Oriens (the East).

Governors
(List based on Rémy Bernard, Les carrières sénatoriales dans les provinces romaines d'Anatolie au Haut-Empire (31 av. J.-C. - 284 ap. J.-C.) (Istanbul: Institut Français d'Études Anatoliennes-Georges Dumézil, 1989), pp. 279-329)

Imperial legates 
 Quintus Veranius (AD 43–48)
 M. Calpurnius Rufus (48-53)
 Titus Clodius Eprius Marcellus (53-56)
 Gaius Licinius Mucianus (c. 60)
 Sextus Marcius Priscus (67-70)
 Marcus Hirrius Fronto Neratius Pansa (70-72)
 Gnaeus Avidius Celer Fiscillinus Firmus (72-74)
 Lucius Luscius Ocrea (74-76)
 Marcus Petronius Umbrinus (76-78)
 Titus Aurelius Quietus (78-81)
 Gaius Caristanius Fronto (81-84)
 Publius Baebius Italicus (84-87)
 Gaius Antius Aulus Iulius Quadratus (c. 90–93)
 Lucius Domitius Apollinaris (c. 93–96)
 Lucius Julius Marinus Caecilius Simplex (96-99)
 Gaius Trebonius Proculus Mettius Modestus (99-103)
 Quintus Pompeius Falco (103-105)
 Lucius Julius Frugi (113-115)
 Gaius Trebius Maximus (115-117)
 Titus Pomponius Antistianus Funisulanus Vettonianus (117-119 or 120)
 Gaius Valerius Severus (120-122 or 121–123)
 Marcus Flavius Aper (c. 125–128)
 Publius Sufenas Verus (128?-131?)
 ?Mettius Modestus (130-133)
 [Domiti]us Seneca (133-135 or 136)
 Titus Calestrius Tiro Julius Maternus (135 or 136–138)
 Gnaeus Arrius Cornelius Proculus (138-140)
 Julius Aqui[linus] (140-142)
 Decimus Junius Paetus (?142-?144)
 Quintus Voconius Saxa Fidus (?143-147)
 Gaius Julius Avitus (?147-?149)
 Decimus Rupilius Severus (149-151)
 Julius Proculus (attested September 152)
 Gaius Septimius Severus (c. 154 and 159)

Senatorial praetorian proconsuls 
 Publius Vigellius Saturninus (c. 162–164)
 Sal[...] (between 162 and 167)
 Tiberius Julius Frugi (c. 167/168)
 Licinius Priscus (attested 23 March 178)
 Gaius Julius Saturninus (?178/179)
 M.? Claudius Cassius Apronianus (?179/180)
 Marcus Gavius Crispus Numisius Junior (c. 182–184)
 Marcus Umbrius Primus (c. 185)
 Gaius Pomponius Bassus Terentianus (186?/187?)
 Titus Flavius Carminius Athenagoras Claudianus (during reign of Commodus)
 Sulpicius Justus (between 193 and 200)
 Gnaeus Pomepeius Hermippus Aelianus (between 180 and 212)
 Julius Tarius Titianus (around 202 and 205)
 Gaius Porcius Priscus Longinus (reign of Caracalla?)
 Titus Flavius Philinus (c. 225–230)
 Quintus Ranius Terentius Honoratianus Festus (reign of Alexander Severus)
 Tiberius Pollenius Armenius Peregrinus (242/243)
 [...] Julianus Sura Magnus (c. 245)
 Ae(lius)? Pollio (249-251)
 Publius Julius Aemilius Aquila (between 253 and 276)

Equestrian procurators 
 Terentius Marcianus (reign of Probus)
 Flavius Areianus Alypius (reign of Probus)

Notes

References
Fatih Onur (2008). "Two Procuratorian Inscriptions from Perge". Gephyra 5: 53–66.
Jones, A. H. M., The Cities of the Eastern Roman Provinces, Oxford University Press academic monograph reprints, 1998; 
Şahin, Sencer Mustafa Adak (2007). Stadiasmus Patarensis. Likya Eyaleti Roma Yollari / Itinera Romana Provinciae Lyciae, Arkeoloji Sanat Yayinlari, 2011;  (in Turkish)
Syme R., "Galatia and Pamphylia under Augustus: The Governorships of Piso, Quirinius and Silvanus", Klio, 27 (1934), pp. 122–147;
Syme R., "Pamphylia from Augustus to Vespasian", Klio, 30 (1937), pp. 227–231

 
Lycia
Pamphylia
States and territories established in the 70s
70s establishments in the Roman Empire
70s establishments